Themes from Mr. Lucky, The Untouchables and Other TV Action Jazz is the second album by American jazz guitarist Mundell Lowe with theme music from detective, legal, and police television programs. The album was recorded in 1960 for RCA Camden.

This album came after TV Action Jazz!, Lowe's previous album of television theme songs. The record label Lone Hill Jazz combined both albums into one compilation, Complete TV Action Jazz. Themes includes music from Markham, Mr. Lucky, Johnny Staccato, Tightrope!, and The Untouchables.

Track listing 
 "Theme from Tightrope" (George Duning) – 2:52
 "Hawaiian Eye" (Jerry Livingston, Mack David) – 3:53
 "Theme from Mr. Lucky" (Henry Mancini) – 3:11
 "Theme from the Untouchables" (Nelson Riddle) – 2:53
 "Bourbon Street Beat" (Livingston, David) – 2:47
 "Detectives Theme" (Herschel Burke Gilbert) – 2:32
 "Markham Theme" (Stanley Wilson) – 2:53
 "Johnny Staccato's Theme" (Elmer Bernstein) – 4:00

Personnel 
 Mundell Lowe – guitar
 Clark Terry – trumpet
 Willie Dennis – trombone
 Urbie Green – trombone
 Frank Rehak – trombone
 Rod Levitt – bass trombone
 Dick Hixson – bass trombone
 Phil Bodner – reeds
 Eddie Costa – piano, vibraphone
 George Duvivier – double bass
 Ed Shaughnessy – drums

References 

1960 albums
Mundell Lowe albums
RCA Camden Records albums
Instrumental albums
Television music